The 1948 season of the Primera División Peruana, the top category of Peruvian football, was played by 9 teams. The national champions were Alianza Lima.

Results

Standings

External links 
 Peru 1948 season at RSSSF
 Peruvian Football League News 

Peru1
1948 in Peruvian football
Peruvian Primera División seasons